The Offspring is an American punk rock band formed in 1984, and currently consists of Dexter Holland (lead vocals, guitar), Noodles (lead and rhythm guitars, backing vocals)and Todd Morse (bass, backing vocals).

The band has released nine studio albums: The Offspring (1989), Ignition (1992), Smash (1994), Ixnay on the Hombre (1997), Americana (1998), Conspiracy of One (2000), Splinter (2003), Rise and Fall, Rage and Grace (2008), and Days Go By (2012). The last six albums were released by Columbia Records in the US, while the first three were released by Nemesis Records and Epitaph Records respectively. One of the most commercially successful punk rock bands, The Offspring has sold over 40 million albums worldwide.

3D Awards
The International 3D Awards is the largest and most respected set of awards for the 3D, computer graphics industry worldwide. The annual 3D Awards ceremony is held during the 3D Festival events in Copenhagen, Denmark. The Offspring has won one award.

|-
|rowspan="1" align="center"| 2004 || "Hit That" || Music Video Visual Effects || 
|-
|}

California Music Awards
The California Music Awards or CAMA is an annual awards ceremony held in California. The Offspring has won two awards.

|-
|rowspan="1" align="center"| 2004 || Splinter || Outstanding Alternative Album || 
|-
|rowspan="1" align="center"| 2009 || Rise and Fall, Rage and Grace || Outstanding Alternative Album || 
|-
|}

Juno Awards
The Juno Awards are presented annually to Canadian musical artists and bands to acknowledge their artistic and technical achievements in all aspects of music. The Offspring has received one nomination.

|-
|rowspan="1" align="center"| 2000 || Americana || Best Selling Album (Foreign or Domestic) || 
|-
|}

Kerrang! Awards
The Kerrang! Awards is an annual awards ceremony held by Kerrang!, a British rock magazine. The Offspring has won two awards from three nominations.

|-
|rowspan="1" align="center"| 1999 || Pretty Fly (For a White Guy) || Best Video|| 
|-
|rowspan="1" align="center"| 2002 || The Offspring || Classic Songwriter || 
|-
|rowspan="1" align="center"| 2004 || | "Hit That" || Best Video || 
|-
|}

MTV Europe Music Awards
The MTV Europe Music Awards is an annual awards ceremony established in 1994 by MTV Europe. The Offspring has won one award from three nominations.

|-
|rowspan="3" align="center"| 1999 || The Offspring || Best Group || 
|-
| The Offspring || Best Rock Artist || 
|-
| Americana || Best Album || 
|-
|}

MTV Video Music Awards
The MTV Video Music Awards were established in 1984 by MTV to celebrate the top music videos of the year. The Offspring has received two nominations.

|-
|rowspan="2" align="center"| 1999 ||rowspan="2" align="center"| "Pretty Fly (for a White Guy)" || Best Rock Video ||
|-
| International Viewer's Choice — MTV Russia ||
|-
|}

Loudwire Music Awards
Loudwire is an online magazine that covers hard rock and heavy metal music, Offspring has received 1 nomination 

|-
|rowspan="1" align="center"| 2014 || "Dividing By Zero / Slim Pickens Does The Right Thing And Rides The Bomb To Hell" || Best Rock Video ||
|-
|}

OC Music Awards
The OC Music Awards is an annual awards ceremony established in 2000 and held in Orange County (California). The Offspring has won 9 awards from 14 nominations.

|-
|rowspan="6" align="center"| 2001 || Conspiracy of One || Best Album || 
|-
| "Original Prankster" || Best Song || 
|-
| The Offspring || Best Alternative || 
|-
| The Offspring || Best Punk || 
|-
| The Offspring || Best World || 
|-
| The Offspring || Best Live Band || 
|-
|rowspan="3" align="center"| 2004 || Splinter || Best Album || 
|-
| "Hit That" || Best Song || 
|-
| The Offspring || Best Alternative || 
|-
|rowspan="2" align="center"| 2009 || Rise and Fall, Rage and Grace || Best Album || 
|-
| "Hammerhead" || Best Song || 
|-
|rowspan="1" align="center"| 2013 || The Offspring || Best Punk || 
|-
|rowspan="2" align="center"| 2014 || The Offspring || Impact Award || 
|-
|rowspan="2" align="center"| || Best Alternative || 
|-
|}

The Billboard Music Awards

The Billboard Music Award is an honor given by Billboard, a publication and music popularity chartcovering the music business. The Billboard Music Awards show had been held annually since 1989 in December until it went dormant in 2006. The awards returned in 2011 and is held annually in May.

|-
|rowspan="1" align="center"| 1999 || "The Offspring" || Modern Rock Artist of the Year || 
|-
|rowspan="1" align="center"| 1997 || "Gone Away" || Modern Rock Tracks || 
|-
|}

References

Awards
Lists of awards received by American musician
Lists of awards received by musical group